Splottside Rocksteady is the debut album of Welsh ska band Shootin' Goon. The album title was inspired by the Splott area of the band's hometown Cardiff. It was released on July 31, 2000 by Moon Ska Europe and has received critical acclaim from the likes of Kerrang! and Metal Hammer.

Track listing
 "Rick Loves Jo"
 "Bradley"
 "My Art"
 "Back Again"
 "To Anyone"
 "Prove Yourself"
 "Wootini"
 "Black and Blue"
 "Fallin'"
 "Changes"
 "Creeps"
 "Late Night Rumbles"
 "Plain to See"
 "YMCA"

Line Up (at time of recording)
James Alexander - Vocals
Paul Hewett - Guitar
Jimi Hewett - Bass
Sam Kendall - Drums
James Watkins - Trumpet
Dan - Saxophone
Tom Harle - Trombone

Earlier sessions included Dan Jones on Trombone and Jon Saunders on Vocals.

External links
myspace.com/shootingoon
Moon Ska Europe profile of Shootin' Goon
Philosophy

Shootin' Goon albums
2000 debut albums